Norbert Sattler (4 October 1951 – 19 January 2023) was an Austrian slalom canoeist who competed from the late 1960s to the mid-1980s. He won a silver medal in the K-1 event at the 1972 Summer Olympics in Munich.

Sattler also won five medals at the ICF Canoe Slalom World Championships with two golds (K-1: 1973, K-1 team: 1971) two silvers (K-1 team: 1977, 1979) and a bronze (K-1: 1977).

References

External links

1951 births
2023 deaths
Austrian male canoeists
Canoeists at the 1972 Summer Olympics
Olympic canoeists of Austria
Olympic silver medalists for Austria
Olympic medalists in canoeing
Medalists at the 1972 Summer Olympics
Medalists at the ICF Canoe Slalom World Championships
People from Hermagor District